The PostScript Standard Encoding (often spelled StandardEncoding, aliased as PostScript) is one of the character sets (or encoding vectors) used by Adobe Systems' PostScript (PS) since 1984 (1982). In 1995, IBM assigned code page 1276 (CCSID 1276) to this character set. NeXT based the character set for its NeXTSTEP and OPENSTEP operating systems on this one.

Character set
The following table shows the PostScript Standard Encoding. Each character is shown with a potential Unicode equivalent. Codepoints 00hex (0) to 7Fhex (127) are nearly identical to ASCII. (The characters at positions 27hex and 60hex reflect an earlier interpretation of the visual appearance of those ASCII characters than the interpretation that was formalized in Unicode; see .)  The upper half of the table contains punctuation and typographic characters, currency symbols, ligatured letters, a selection of modified base letters used in European languages, and a selection of diacritic marks to be used in composing accented letters.

See also
Display PostScript (DPS)
NeXT character set
PostScript fonts

References

Character sets